Pratibha Satpathy (born: 27 November 1945) is a poet of Odia literature. She has been recognised as one of the leading poets of the country and has been honoured with the Sahitya Akademi Award.

Biography
She has been writing poetry in Odia for more than forty years. She is editor of poetry magazine Udbhasa which is published quarterly. Previously she was the editor of the Odia magazine Istahaar for 25 years. Satpathy has also translated a number of famous English literary works by writers such as Pearl S. Buck into Odia language. Many of her books in Odia have been translated into Hindi by herself. She has won several awards.

Major works 
Poetry collections
 Ama Kavita (1962)
 Asta Janhara Elegy (1969)
 Grasta Samaya (1974)
 Sahada Sundari (1978)
 Niyata Vasudha ( 1980, II edition 1987)
 Nimishe Akshara (1985)
 Mahamegha (1988)
 Sabari (1991, II edition 2005)
 Tanmaya Dhuli (1996, II edition 2003)
 Adha Adha Nakshyatra (2001)
 Kahi Na Hele (2006)

Poetry collections in Hindi/English (translated from Odia) and their publishers
 Samaya Nahin Hai (1994); Radhakrishna Prakashan, New Delhi.
 Sabari (1996); Vani Prakashan, Daryaganj, New Delhi.
 Adha Adha Nakshyatra (2001); Medha Book, Sahadara, New Delhi.
 Tanmaya Dhuli (2004); Kendriya Sahitya Akademi, New Delhi.
 A Time of Rising (2003); Harananda Publications, New Delhi.
 For you Once, Everytime (2011); Vidya Puri, Cuttack

Literary criticisms/essays
 Kalpanara Abhisekha (1982, II edition 1997).
 Spandanara Bhumi (1994).
 Pratiphalana (1995).
 Post Modern Oriya Poetry & other Essays (1999, II edition 2006).
 Bharata Matara Looha (2002).
 Barnila Bhogapura (2004).
 Biography of Smt. Sarala Devi, by NBT.
 Ever Flows the River (2011) –  A CD containing poetry recitations and appreciation of recognised poets and writers with soft sweet melody

Translations
 Arana Swapnara Rati ('The Hidden Flower' a novel by Pearl S. Buck), three editions.
 Kritadas ('The Slave' a novel by Isaac B. Singer), two editions
 Kalhana Charita (Central Sahitya Academy Translation Scheme)
 Nagara Manthan (Central Sahitya Academy Translation Scheme)
 Subramanium Bharati (NBT, New Delhi Translation Scheme)
 Sahasara Shikha ('The Crane Fly Early', a novel by Chinghiz Aitmatov)
 Bhinna Deshira Muhan (Latvian poetry by Maris Caklais & Raison)
 Memoirs (Shaishaba ru Samsara, 2008)
 Pratibha: from dust to star (with commentary from friends and critics in Odia, English, and Hindi; 2011)

Awards and recognition 
National
 2014 – Sahitya Bharati Samman-2013
 2007 – Poetess Subhadra Kumari Chauhan Sahitya Samman by Rashtriya Hindi Akademi & Rupambara, Kolkata, 2007
 2003 – R.G National Sadbhabana Award
 2001 – Kendra  Sahitya Akademi Award for Poetry Collection ‘Tanmaya Dhuli’
 1999 – N.N. Thirumalamba Award of Karnataka for Poetry Collection ‘Adha Adha Nakshyatra’
 1996 – Critic Circle India Award

Regional
 2011 – Sahitya Prithivi
 2008 – Utkal Surya Samman
 2007 – Bhubaneswar Book Fair Award
 2005 – S.B.I. Poetry Honor
 2005 – SAIL Poetry Honor
 2005 – J.K. Paper Mills Poetry Honor, Rayagada
 1992 – Sarala Award of IMFA Charitable Trust
 1986 – State (Orissa) Sahitya Akademi Award for Poetry Collection ‘Nimishe Akshara’
 1985 – Dharitri-Samajbadi Society Poetry Award
 1981 – Vishuba Award, Prajatantra Prachar Samiti, Orissa
 1962 – Prajatantra Young Poet's Award

References

External links 
 pratibhasatpathy.com
 Books by Prativa Satpathy published by Orissa Publishers
 paramitasatpathy.com/life2 vidyapuri.com
 orissadiary.com/personality

1945 births
Living people
Recipients of the Sahitya Akademi Award in Odia
Recipients of the Odisha Sahitya Akademi Award
Poets from Odisha
Indian women poets
Women writers from Odisha
Odia-language poets
20th-century Indian poets
21st-century Indian poets
20th-century Indian women writers
21st-century Indian women writers